Donatus was a Benedictine monk. He was born in Ripacandida, Italy. He became a Benedictine in 1194, at Petina, Italy.

References

Italian Roman Catholic saints
12th-century Christian saints
1198 deaths
1179 births
Italian Benedictines